Jim A. Kuypers is an American scholar and consultant specializing in communication studies. A professor at Virginia Tech, he has written on the news media, rhetorical criticism and presidential rhetoric, and is particularly known for his work in political communication which explores the qualitative aspects of framing analysis and its relationship to presidential communication and news media bias.

Career
Kuypers graduated with a Bachelor of Science and a Master of Arts from Florida State University. He was a senior lecturer in rhetoric and oratory, Director of speech at Dartmouth College, taught at  Florida State University, and Florida Atlantic University. He taught at Louisiana State University, where he earned a Ph.D. in communication studies.
Since 2005 Kuypers has been teaching at Virginia Tech.

Scholarship
Kuypers' work falls into two categories: political communication and rhetorical criticism. The former spans both communication and political science, involving the study of the political rhetoric of individuals and groups. For Kuypers, politics is a process that takes place through communication, rather than the sheer exercise or attempt at power.

Political communication
Kuypers searches for media bias, and how the news media frames political news. He developed a qualitative (rhetorical) version of framing analysis  designed to look for bias, and to understand how the original messages of political actors are reframed by the press before transmitted to the public.   He has investigated how news broadcasts, stories, and editorials shape public understanding of issues and events in a particular direction. Quote: "Framing is a process whereby communicators, consciously or unconsciously, act to construct a point of view that encourages the facts of a given situation to be interpreted by others in a particular manner. Frames operate in four key ways: they define problems, diagnose causes, make moral judgments, and suggest remedies. Frames are often found within a narrative account of an issue or event, and are generally the central organizing idea."

A framing analysis trilogy

Presidential Crisis Rhetoric and the Press
Kuypers' first major work examining framing, politics, and the news media was the 1997 book Presidential Crisis Rhetoric and the Press in the Post-Cold War World. In this work he examined the changed nature of presidential crisis rhetoric since the ending of the cold war, and first advanced a qualitative version of comparative framing analysis.  It was here that he first used the term "agenda-extension" to describe a process where the news media "beyond the strict reporting of events" and instead foster a particular understanding of an issue or event. In relation to other theories of the press, Kuypers argues that "agenda-extension begins when media gatekeepers decide to publish a particular story because issues are often framed by station managers, producers, or editors by how they decide to tell a particular story.  Although deciding what story to tell (gate-keeping) is the first step in all news reporting, the press takes a second step when determining how much attention to give to the story (agenda-setting), and a third step when they determine how to tell the story (agenda-extension).

Press Bias and Politics 
In his 2002 book Press Bias and Politics: How the Media Frame Controversial Issues Kuypers comparatively analyzed the speeches of five public figures, ranging from ministers to presidents from 1995 to 2000. He examined approximately 700 press reports on controversial issues that were published in 116 different newspapers. He reports finding a "left of center bias in mainstream press reporting". Kuypers puts forward four distinct journalistic practices allowing bias to seep into reporting. He concludes that only "a narrow brand of liberal thought" was supported by the press, with "all other positions shut out or shut down". Kuypers has stated in an interview with the Cybercast News Service that "this bias hurts the democratic process in general" and that the U.S. mainstream press "is an anti-democratic institution".

Bush's War 
Kuypers' third book was Bush's War: Media Bias and Justifications for War in a Terrorist Age. According to Kuypers, "The idea [in the book was to] look for themes about 9-11 and the War on Terror that the President used, and then look at what themes the press used when reporting on what the president said. After identifying themes, I determine how those themes are framed. Through this comparative analysis, we can detect differences in the frames presented to the American people, and determine the nature of any press bias." Kuypers found that the news media echoed the president's themes and the framing of those themes immediately following 9/11.  But just eight weeks later, the press had changed its manner of reporting, was actually framing Bush as an enemy of civil liberties, and was actively helping critics of the president.

Framing analysis and moral foundations theory

President Trump and the News Media: Moral Foundations, Framing, and the Nature of Press Bias in America

In this work Kuypers incorporates elements of Moral Foundations Theory to investigate the ideological underpinnings of press reports. Using a rhetorical version of framing analysis, he analyzes four major speeches by President Trump and compares them with the reporting on those speeches by the mainstream news media. The moral foundations of both Trump and the news media are examined to assess their respective moral/ideological underpinnings. The results both extends and refutes parts of framing theory by demonstrating how frames do not give rise to moral assessments as previously thought, but rather the presence of moral foundations provide moral substance to frames as they are developed and found throughout news coverage.  These results, the first combining framing analysis and moral foundations theory in this manner, reveal how journalists inject bias consciously and unconsciously into hard news stories, and that their moral foundations act to privilege liberal concerns and denigrate conservative concerns. Kuypers argues in this work that the news media framing acted to treat President Trump not as a source of news, but as a political opponent while at the same time helping the political opposition of the President. By evaluating journalistic practices through the lens of their own published ethical standards, Kuypers argues that contemporary journalistic practices are damaging the American Republic and makes the case for immediate incorporation of viewpoint diversity within news organizations.

Rhetorical criticism
Kuypers edited the 2009 book Rhetorical Criticism: Perspectives in Action  in which he explains rhetoric and rhetorical criticism, and presents 16 different perspectives on how to perform rhetorical criticism. Kuypers has written about "rhetorical criticism" and tried to explain "advocacy based criticism" in his 2000 article "Must We All Be Political Activists?" and the 2001 article "Criticism, Politics, and Objectivity: Redivivus".

In his latest work on rhetorical criticism, "Purpose, Practice, and Pedagogy in Rhetorical Criticism", Kuypers brings together 15 nationally and internationally recognized rhetorical critics who each contribute a chapter examining the three areas mentioned in the title of the book.  According to Kuypers, the chapter authors "enter into the continuing discussion about the purpose of criticism, yet move beyond this to address on a personal level how they actually perform criticism, and also how they actually teach criticism to others.  All the authors in this book agree on the societal importance of knowledge about the creation and critique of rhetoric.  Additionally, the authors collectively provide wide ranging and strong justifications for teaching rhetorical criticism."

Selected publications
 President Trump and the News Media: Moral Foundations, Framing, and the Nature of Press Bias in America (Lanham, MD: Lexington Books, 2020). 
 The 2016 American Presidential Campaign and the News Media: Implications for the American Republic and Democracy (Lexington Books, 2018).  
 Rhetorical Criticism: Perspectives in Action, 2nd Edition. (Rowman & Littlefield, 2016).  
 Purpose, Practice, and Pedagogy in Rhetorical Criticism (Rowman & Littlefield, 2014).  
 Partisan Journalism: A History of Media Bias in the United States (Rowman & Littlefield, 2014).  
 Media Smackdown: Deconstructing the News and the Future of Journalism (Peter Lang, 2013). Abe Aamidor, Jim A Kuypers, and Susan Wiesinger. 
 Doing News Framing Analysis: Empirical and Theoretical Perspectives (Routledge, 2010). Paul D'Angelo and Jim A. Kuypers, eds.  
 Politics and Communication in America: Campaigns, Media, and Governing in the 21st Century (Long Grove, IL: Waveland Press, 2008).  Robert E. Denton and Jim A. Kuypers.  
 Bush's War: Press Bias and Framing of the War on Terror  (Lanham, MD: Rowman and Littlefield, 2006). 
 "A Comparative Framing Analysis of Embedded and Behind-the-Lines Reporting on the 2003 Iraq War," Qualitative Research Reports in Communication  6.1 (2005): 1–10. Jim A. Kuypers and Stephen Cooper
 The Art of Rhetorical Criticism (Boston: AllynBacon, 2005). .
 Compassionate Conservatism: The Rhetorical Reconstruction of Conservative Rhetoric, The American Communication Journal 6.4 (2003).
 Press Bias and Politics: How the Media Frame Controversial Issues"  (Westport, CT: Praeger, 2002). 
 Twentieth-Century Roots of Rhetorical Studies (Westport, CT: Praeger, 2001). Jim A. Kuypers and Andrew King, eds.  
 Presidential Crisis Rhetoric and the Press in the Post-Cold War World'' (Westport, CT: Praeger, 1997).

See also
Media bias
Media bias in the United States
Rhetorical criticism
War on Terrorism

References

Year of birth missing (living people)
Living people
American literary critics
American media critics
Virginia Tech faculty
Florida State University alumni
Louisiana State University alumni
Place of birth missing (living people)
Framing theorists